Högberg is a Swedish surname. Notable people with the surname include:

Elisabeth Högberg (born 1986), Swedish biathlete
Folke Högberg (1884–1972), Swedish Army lieutenant general
Lars Erik Högberg (1858–1924), Swedish Christian missionary
Linus Högberg (born 1998), Swedish ice hockey player
Marcus Högberg (born 1994), Swedish ice hockey player

Swedish-language surnames